Dianthus armeria, the Deptford pink or grass pink, is a species of Dianthus ("pink") native to most of Europe, from Portugal north to southern Scotland and southern Finland, and east to Ukraine and the Caucasus. It is naturalised in North America.

Description

It has widely spaced, paired leaves, and above these it branches rather sparingly. At the ends of the stems there are short-stalked or stalkless clusters of deep-pink flowers that are surrounded by erect, hairy, leaf-like bracts. These can also be located laterally. The leaves are hairy, dark green in colour and slim in shape.

Distribution
Dianthus armeria is native to Europe, where it is widespread as far north as 60°N in Scandinavia, extending eastwards to Armenia and the Caucasus, and as far south as Spain and Sicily. It has been introduced to North America, where it is now naturalised and is widespread. In Britain it is now extirpated as a native species from Scotland and is known from a few dozen sites in England and 4-5 sites in Wales, including a nature reserve in Flintshire, a quarry near Pontypridd in Rhondda Cynon Taf, near a reservoir in the vicinity of Port Talbot and along a farm track on a site near Llanelli.

Habitat and ecology
Dianthus armeria is a species of open and periodically disturbed sites. It is normally an annual but can be biennial or a short-lived perennial. New leaf rosettes form at the base of old plants from buds located on their roots, demonstrating that this species is in fact a short-lived perennial and has a life-span of less than two and a half years. It flowers from July to September. Its flowers are scentless and do not appear to be insect pollinated often, with self-pollination the norm. Each plant gradually releases around 400 seeds from their pods; however, some plants may hold a small fraction of the seeds they produce over winter. It closes its blooms in the late afternoons.

Cultivation and uses

It is widely grown as an ornamental plant in gardens. Populations have been introduced to and have become naturalised in New Zealand and much of North America.

Name
The name Deptford pink was coined in the 17th century by naturalist Thomas Johnson, who described a pink flower growing in Deptford in South-East London. However, it is very likely that Johnson was actually describing the related maiden pink, and it is unlikely that this species has grown in the area it is named after since the city of London was built.

References

armeria
Plants described in 1753
Taxa named by Carl Linnaeus
Flora of Europe
Flora of Portugal
Flora of Finland
Flora of the United Kingdom
Flora of Ukraine
Flora of the Caucasus